Syllepte ruricolalis is a moth species in the family Crambidae. It was described by Snellen in 1880. It is found in Indonesia (Sulawesi).

References

Moths described in 1880
ruricolalis
Moths of Indonesia